Everything Ecstatic is the fourth album by Four Tet, released on 23 May 2005.

The video for lead single "Smile Around the Face" features actor Mark Heap.

Track listing
 "A Joy" – 3:07
 "Smile Around the Face" – 4:30
 "Fuji Check" – 0:23
 "Sun Drums and Soil" – 6:14
 "Clouding" – 1:43
 "And Then Patterns" – 4:42
 "High Fives" – 5:06
 "Turtle Turtle Up" – 2:09
 "Sleep, Eat Food, Have Visions" – 7:43
 "You Were There With Me" – 5:52

DVD edition
A DVD edition of the album, featuring a video for each of the tracks, was released on 7 November 2005 and comes with a bonus CD of previously unreleased material, Everything Ecstatic Part 2, the track listing of which is as follows:
 "Turtle Turtle Up (extended version)" – 16:16
 "Sun Drums and Soil (part 2)" – 5:31
 "Watching Wavelength" – 4:31
 "This is Six Minutes" – 6:03
 "Ending" – 0:50

Everything Ecstatic Part 2 was later released separately on vinyl through Domino Records.

Charts

References

External links
Everything Ecstatic release page from the Domino Records website

2005 albums
Domino Recording Company albums
Four Tet albums
Albums produced by Kieran Hebden